Ivar Høsteng Neerland (4 March 1907 – 19 July 1978) was a Norwegian politician for the Conservative Party.

He served as a deputy representative to the Parliament of Norway from Møre og Romsdal during the term 1958–1961. In total he met during 19 days of parliamentary session.

References

1907 births
1978 deaths
Deputy members of the Storting
Conservative Party (Norway) politicians
Møre og Romsdal politicians